Náutico (nautical in Portuguese) may refer to:

Clube Náutico Capibaribe, Brazilian football club, based in Recife, Pernambuco
Náutico Futebol Clube, Brazilian football club, based in Boa Vista, Roraima
Clube Náutico Marcílio Dias, Brazilian football club, based in Itajaí, Santa Catarina
Club Náutico, Chilean football club, now known as Universidad de Chile (football club)
Club Náutico Hacoaj, Argentine sports club
Club Nautico di Roma, Italian yacht club
Club Náutico, Cuban member's club
Náutico (Havana), neighborhood in Playa, Havana, Cuba